The Scottish Prohibition Party was a minor Scottish political party which advocated alcohol prohibition.

The party was founded in 1901. In its early years, Bob Stewart acted as the party's full-time organiser.  In 1908, Stewart and Edwin Scrymgeour were elected to Dundee Town Council.

From the 1908 by-election onwards, Scrymgeour stood for the party in the Dundee constituency. Stewart acted as his election agent in 1910, but fell out with him over his religiosity. He led a Marxist split, the Socialist Prohibition and Reform Party, which merged with the Communist Party of Great Britain in 1920.

Scrymgeour was finally elected as an MP for Dundee in the 1922 general election, when he and the Labour candidate E. D. Morel defeated the National Liberal candidates, one of which was future Prime Minister Winston Churchill. In Parliament, on issues other than prohibition, he generally supported the Labour Party.

Scrymgeour lost his seat at the 1931 general election.  The party was disbanded in 1935, against the wishes of Scrymgeour.

See also
 National Prohibition Party (UK)
 Prohibition Party; the third longest established party in the United States.

References

Further reading
 Southgate, Donald, "Edwin Scrymgeour" in Three Dundonians (Dundee: Abertay Historical Society, 1968)

1901 establishments in Scotland
Alcohol in Scotland
Prohibition Party, Scottish
Political parties established in 1901
Political parties disestablished in 1935
Prohibition by country
Prohibition parties
Temperance movement by country
Temperance organizations
1935 disestablishments in the United Kingdom
Prohibition in the United Kingdom